Loathe are an English heavy metal band from Liverpool. Formed in 2014, the group consists of lead vocalist Kadeem France, guitarist and second vocalist Erik Bickerstaffe, drummer Sean Radcliffe and bassist Feisal El-Khazragi.

They are signed to SharpTone Records and have released two EPs and three studio albums. Prepare Consume Proceed was released in 2015 and was re-issued in 2016 through SharpTone Records as the label's first release. They released their debut studio album, the Cold Sun, in 2017, then a split EP recorded with label-mate Holding Absence titled This Is as One in 2018. Loathe released their second studio album I Let It In and It Took Everything on 7 February 2020. Their third studio album the Things They Believe was released on 7 February 2021 as an extension of their previous album, and was made up entirely of ambient tracks.

The band's music makes use of elements of metalcore and nu metal, while also incorporating more experimental aspects from genres like shoegaze, progressive metal and industrial music. Loathe have been nominated for Heavy Metal Awards best UK breakthrough band and Metal Hammer Golden Gods Awards best new band in 2018. In a 2020 poll by Revolver magazine, they were voted the third most likely contemporary band to break through into the mainstream.

History

Formation and Prepare Consume Proceed EP (2011–2016) 
Loathe has its origins in the Liverpool melodic metalcore band Our Imbalance, which Erik Bickerstaffe was a founding member of. Eventually, Kadeem France, who at that time was the drummer for Escapists UK, replaced Our Imbalance's founding vocalist Harry Rule. By 2014, the band also included drummer Sean Radcliffe. Around this time, Our Imbalance morphed into Loathe with the recruitment of guitarist Connor Sweeney and bassist Shayne Smith.

In 2015, they performed at Deadbolt Festival on 8 August, and in Autumn that same year they released their first EP titled "Prepare Consume Proceed" independently. The band initially kept their names anonymous, using stage names (DRK, DRT, SNK, MWL and NIL) along with not revealing their origin. Kadeem France was the only one whose stage name was revealed (DRK) as he is the lead vocalist, and was identified by a prophetic mask of unknown significance, which was used as the album artwork for their EP. on 22 November, the band supported metal band Empires Fade during their show in Manchester.

Moving onto June 2016, the band would tour as support act for Oceans Ate Alaska during their UK tour. On 8 July the same year, their EP was re-issued through SharpTone Records as the labels first release since its conception a month prior, and was accompanied with a music video for a new song exclusive to the re-issue, "In Death", which featured France wearing his mask. Bickerstaffe explained that the band was discovered by the label shortly after their independent release of their first music video for Sheol/In Death, and after their initial dialogue and exchanging of ideas, the band and label managers "clicked" and they partnered up. The EP received positive reviews, Kerrang! magazine praised the album's heavy Djent style and "synthy atmosphere" but criticised the band's horror-like image, stage names and France's mask as "some bargain-bin horror flick", giving the album 3 K's out of 5.

As the band's career progressed, the members decided that the use of code-names and the mask was unnecessary, citing that they just wanted to be themselves when performing their music and pointed to the likes of Ghost and Slipknot and their influences for starting that gimmick in the first place. Bickerstaffe would later admit that their use of masks and code-names was "...shamelessly taking ideas from other bands.", ditching them as a means of distinguishing themselves. Also in early July the band performed at Tech-Fest, later on the same month they toured as the support act for metal band Carcer City around the UK, and on 25 September, the band performed at Ozzfest meets Knotfest California on the Nuclear Blast stage.

The Cold Sun and This Is as One split EP (2017–2018) 

Initially, the band was planned to start off 2017 as a support act for Emmure during their UK tour in January, however due to unforeseen delays in Emmure's album production, the tour was cancelled. In April the band toured as a support act for Blood Youth and in May the band also performed at the London warm-up show for Hellfest. A few months later, they released their debut studio album, titled "The Cold Sun" on 2 June 2017. The album was produced by Matt McClellan and was recorded in the Dark Studios in Atlanta, Georgia. From 23 August to 5 September the band headlined a tour in the UK with metal band Harbinger, following up with three more dates from 6 to 8 with metal band Lotus Eater, and later throughout October and November, the band was the support act for Bury Tomorrow during their "Stage Invasion" tour in the UK. One of their last shows of the year was performed at Binfest 2017 in late November.

Starting off 2018, the band released a split EP with SharpTone Records label mate Holding Absence on 8 February, and was followed up with a co-headline tour in March with support act Modern Error, along with God Complex at a show in Leeds. The band were nominated for their first award at the Metal Hammer Golden Gods Awards for best new band of 2018, and in April they were also be nominated for Heavy Metal Awards best UK breakthrough band, the latter of which the band performed at the award's announcements ceremony in Manchester. The band performed at the Slam Dunk and Teddy Rocks festivals in May, and in June the band's bassist Shayne Smith announced that after performing at Download Festival, he will be departing from the band to pursue a career as a tattoo artist, with his role being filled by ex-Holding Absence guitarist Feisal El-Khazragi. In early July the band performed at the 2018 Tech-Fest, and later that same month the band performed at the 2000 trees festival. In September, they were the supporting band for Sikth during their "Riddles of Humanity" UK tour, along with also supporting Of Mice & Men on their mini-tour in the UK in November. In December, the band supported metal band Palm Reader in London.

When queried regarding new music, Bickerstaffe confirmed that the band had been writing new songs, stating that at some point they may recluse somewhere to focus solemnly on making music, though at the time he admitted that he wasn't sure if the next album would be an EP or a full studio release, with an initial prediction of it being released in 2019. In October 2018, Bickerstaffe commented that the band had planned 12 new songs for the album, meanwhile he was also busy producing music for other metals acts, one such release being the EP "Created Sick" by Merseyside band God Complex whom they toured with earlier the same year, while vocalist Kadeem France collaborated with metal band Of Legions on their single "Vision of Misery".

I Let It In and It Took Everything and the Things They Believe (2019–2022) 
In late April and early May, Loathe supported Hollywood Undead on the stretch of their UK tour, attended the Two Thousand Trees Festival in July, and attended both the Radar Festival and the Heavy Metal Music Awards in August. Loathe released an EP titled "Gored/New Face in the Dark" featuring the two new singles on 20 September 2019, along with a music video for "Gored" with one for "New Faces in the Dark" being released on 10 October, and toured through Japan and China throughout the month alongside label mates Crystal Lake. On 29 November, the band released a new song titled Aggressive Evolution, along with the announcement of their new album titled I Let It In and It Took Everything and was set to release on 7 February 2020. In December, the band toured as a support act for Stray from the Path during their European tour, along with the Devil Wears Prada and Gideon.

On 10 January 2020, the band released Two-Way Mirror, accompanied with a music video. The band released the song "Screaming" a day prior to the release of their second album on 6 February in anticipation of its release, which coincided with their UK Headlining tour, where they were supported by bands The Well Runs Red, Phoxjaw, and God Complex. Upon the album's release, Bickerstaffe expressed that the new family of tracks "...offers a brand new perspective and identity for Loathe." while still retaining some familiar aspects of their previous music. In June, the band participated in the virtual Download Festival.

On 22 January 2021, the band announced that they would release their new album called The Things They Believe on 7 February 2021, exactly one year to the date since the release of I Let It In and It Took Everything, and named after the script of the 2007 vampire thriller 30 Days of Night. It is the band's first instrumental album, and is intended to expand on, and run parallel with, their previous album by creating sonic soundscapes and atmospheres as a means to expand on the Loathe lore, as well as providing solace during lockdown as consequence of the COVID-19 pandemic. The album also features collaborations with The 1975's saxophonist John Waugh, Parting Gift guitarist Peter Vybiral, and Vincent Weight.
On 1 September, Loathe announced that they would be playing the entirety of their album "I Let It in and It Took Everything" as part of an 8-date headline UK tour. It started on 9 December in Glasgow and finished on 18 December in London. It also included a show in their hometown Liverpool on 10 December. On 18 September, the band announced the departure of guitarist Connor Sweeney, while thanking him for his contributions, the guitarist clarified that part of the reason for leaving was because he "thought some things might have changed with time within the band but unfortunately in this case things continued to stay the same" so to preserve his sanity and mental health he chose to leave, and added that he would be back with new music and playing shows once "all is ready".

Upcoming fourth studio album (2022–present) 
On 6 January 2022, the band released a new song titled "Dimorphous Display", which was followed by a rerecording of their song, "Is It Really You" featuring Sleep Token.  On August 17, Loathe announced that they had cancelled their upcoming tour in order to focus their efforts on writing and recording their upcoming fourth studio album.

Musical style
Critics have categorised Loathe's music as metalcore, nu metal, shoegaze, progressive metal, post-metal, melodic hardcore, and alternative metal. In an interview with PopMatters, France categorised the band as a "nu-metal-y metalcore band", likening their sound to that of Code Orange and Vein.fm. This sentiment was echoed in an article by Distorted Sound Magazine, where the band were referred to as being part of the latest metalcore movement within the genre, along the likes of Code Orange and Ocean Grove. They have also been grouped by publications like NME and Hysteria magazine with similar bands such as Lotus Eater, Modern Error, Holding Absence and God Complex, noted as a new wave of bands within the genre.

The band often uses the dynamic of clean and unclean vocals. While Bickerstaffe used to be the sole clean vocalist, France has increasingly done more clean vocals on recent songs. Metal Injection, upon reviewing the band's debut studio album The Cold Sun, also went on to call it borderline deathcore along with the band's experimental and progressive take on metalcore, but the likes of DistortedSoundMag.com, TheMonoloth.com and Kerrang! have all also used deathcore/death metal as a way to describe their music. The band have been praised by publications such as Metal Hammer and Metal Injection, for their use of electronics in their music, often delivered purely for atmosphere rather than the forefront of the band's music, and is often accredited as the band's experimental features, often going into industrial territory.

Expanding on the band's metalcore sound further, others have also pointed out the band's incorporation of elements from other genres, one frequent point made is the band's use of djent elements in their music, typically regarding their guitar styles. In an article for Revolver magazine, they were described as making music ranging between "industrialized metallic hardcore that's as crushing as it comes, to shoegaze-inflected post-rock that soars and shimmers". Other elements the band has been found to incorporate in their style are nu metal, shoegaze, and progressive metal. The band has been recommended for listeners of such bands like Attila, Slipknot, Fit for an Autopsy, the Devil Wears Prada, Between the Buried and Me and Code Orange.

The 2021 instrumental album the Things They Believe also showcases the bands ability to create atmospheric sounds and sonic soundscapes with their use of expressionist, experimental, and synth heavy sounds, which has been compared to the works of Trent Reznor & Atticus Ross, Vangelis, and soundtracks to David Lynch films, described as noir-like electronic-ambience.

Lyrical style 
The band describes themselves as a conceptual band, as throughout all of their album releases they have been telling stories of fiction. Their first release, Prepare Consume Proceed, was said to involve a story about a tormented protagonist, who loses a loved one and is later killed by the end of the EP's run. The studio album the Cold Sun tells a narrative of a violent post-apocalyptic setting, mixing themes of desolation with an overarching sense of positivity and heroism. The record supposedly tells a story of two protagonists who exist during this dystopian setting set up by in the album. Bickerstaffe has stated that they don't take influence from other major concept records and acts such as Thirty Seconds to Mars and Pink Floyd, making the remark: "Our inspiration to create concept records mostly comes from wanting to create our own worlds within the music, almost like looking at the album as a book with separate chapters."

For the second album, Bickerstaffe has stated that their writing process starts with the concept, which is spread out across 12 songs. Once they have a plan for what they want to create, they focus on sustaining those songs.

Live performances 
Metal Hammer and WhatCulture writer Matt Mills named the band 2018's greatest live metal act, stating that their presence on stage is "always intense and cinematic" whilst applauding the band's use of atmospheric, minimalist interludes inspired by film soundtracks. The band's lead vocalist Kadeem France utilised a prophetic mask of unknown significance, which was used as the album artwork for their EP. Bickerstaffe mentioned to Kerrang! that they "...take a lot of inspiration from Marvel, DC and the rest of the comic world - seeing our live shows like performance art." adding that "The mask is definitely a big part of that what we do, but it's not entirely everything." Since 2016 however, the band has not used the mask, citing the gimmick to be influenced by major acts such as Ghost and Slipknot, wearing it to pay homage to such bands. During the same year, Kerrang! writer Sam Law criticised the band's use of masks and then stage names in 2016, calling it "shittily clichéd". The use of TV screens on the stage is also utilised for the band's gritty, theatrical presence.

Influences 
Major acts such as Deftones, Slipknot, and Korn have all been cited as major influences on the band's sound, with Bickerstaffe stating that the band aspires to be on the same level as them, going on to say that he and the other members are not inspired by the sound of "modern bands today", preferring the sounds from those they do take influence from. On their earliest releases, Slipknot was their biggest influence, particularly in terms of the band's use of dark atmospheric and industrial elements and vocal aggression. In an interview with Distorted Sound magazine, France and Bickerstaffe also cited Meshuggah as an influence, as well as going onto elaborate that Deftones influenced their use of clean vocals and heavy guitars, and Radiohead influenced their drive to experiment musically. Bickerstaffe has also mentioned that his teenage influences consisted of Miss May I and Attack Attack!, grouping them as synthcore, and whilst at the time he disregarded much music outside of metal at the time, he had matured to enjoy a much greater range of music since.

Major influences outside of the metal band scene are the soundtracks for Silent Hill 2, composed by Akira Yamaoka, and Akira, composed by Geinoh Yamashirogumi, and the Blade Runner soundtrack composed by Vangelis. These soundtracks influenced the band's debut album, the Cold Sun, regarding its story-telling and atmosphere, along with Akira being an influence on the album's artwork. They are also major influences on the bands creation of their 2021 ambient instrumental album the Things They Believe.

Members

Current members
 Kadeem France – lead vocals (2014–present)
 Erik Bickerstaffe – guitars, co-lead vocals (2014–present), keyboards (2018–present)
 Sean Radcliffe – drums (2014–present)
 Feisal El-Khazragi – bass, keyboards, backing vocals (2018–present)

Past members
 Shayne Smith – bass (2014–2018), backing vocals (2017–2018)
 Connor Sweeney – guitars (2014–2021), backing vocals (2017–2021)

Timeline

Discography

Studio albums

EPs

Singles

Music videos

Awards

References

External links
 
 Agency Profile

British nu metal musical groups
Djent
English metalcore musical groups
English progressive metal musical groups
Musical groups established in 2014
Musical groups from Liverpool
Musical quintets
2014 establishments in England